El Marsa  is a port city in Western Sahara.

According to the Moroccan authorities, El Marsa belongs to Laayoune Province in the region of Laâyoune-Sakia El Hamra. Its population in 2014 is 17,917, the second-largest in the province (behind the regional capital El Aaiún) and third in the region. It has a seaport on the Atlantic Ocean and therefore is also known as Laayoune Plage (El Aaiún Beach). The town also has a hospital.

El Marsa is to the west of El Aaiún, on the N1, Morocco's main highway, which also goes into the Western Sahara, where it is the last settlement south until Boujdour.

References 

Populated places in Western Sahara
Port cities and towns in Western Sahara
Municipalities of Morocco
Populated places in Laâyoune Province